Bucklin may refer to:

Places in the United States
 Bucklin, Kansas
 Bucklin, Missouri
 Bucklin Township, North Dakota

People with the surname
 John Bucklin (1773-1844), the first mayor of Louisville, Kentucky

Other uses
 Bucklin voting, a voting method